The Malibamat'so River is a river in northern Lesotho. Its origin is near to the South African border, where it drains the eastern slopes of the Maloti Range.

The Malibamat'so forms the northern arm of the Katse Dam reservoir, a part of the Lesotho Highlands Water Project. Here the river is joined by the Bokong/Bokung River. Downstream the Malibamat'so's left bank tributaries are the Matsoku  and Semenanyane Rivers, before it forms a right bank tributary of the Senqu/Orange River.

Location

References

Rivers of Lesotho